Augustus John Schwertner (December 23, 1870 – October 2, 1939) was an American prelate of the Catholic Church. He served as bishop of the Diocese of Wichita in Kansas from 1921 until his death in 1939.

Biography

Early life and education
Augustus Schwertner was born on December 23, 1870 in Canton, Ohio, the second of eight children of Anton and Christina (née Richart) Schwertner. His father was an Austrian immigrant who worked as a shoemaker. The family were parishioners at St. Peter's Church in Canton, where Schwertner received his early education at the local parochial school.

After graduating from the public high school in Canton, Schwertner studied under the Jesuits at Canisius College in Buffalo, New York. He entered St. Mary's Seminary in  Cleveland, Ohio, in September 1891 to study for the priesthood. His brother Benedict also became a priest, joining the Dominican Order and taking the religious name Thomas Maria.

Priesthood
Schwertner was ordained a priest for the Diocese of Cleveland on June 12, 1897 by Bishop Ignatius Horstmann. Schwertner celebrated his first Mass at his childhood parish, St. Peter's in Canton. He then served for a few months as assistant pastor at St. Columba's Parish in Youngstown, Ohio, until September 1897, when he was named pastor of St. Anthony's Parish in Milan, Ohio. Schwertner was later transferred to Rockport, Ohio, where he served as pastor of St. Mary's Parish (1903-1907).

In June 1907, Schwertner was appointed pastor of St. John's Parish in Lima, Ohio. He was incardinated, or transferred, to the Diocese of Toledo in Ohio in 1910.  In October 1913, Schwertner was appointed chancellor of the diocese by Bishop Joseph Schrembs, placing him in charge of the diocese's business and financial affairs. He given the title of monsignor by Pope Benedict XV in March 1916.

Bishop of Wichita
On March 10, 1921, Schwertner was appointed bishop of the Diocese of Wichita, by Benedict XV. He received his episcopal consecration on June 8, 1921, from Bishop Joseph Schrembs, with Bishops Michael Gallagher and John Tihen serving as co-consecrators. He took charge of the Diocese of Wichita on June 22, 1921, when he was installed at the Cathedral of the Immaculate Conception in Wichita.

When Schwertner arrived in Wichita in 1921, the diocese contained 110 priests, 81 parishes, 49 parochial schools, and eight hospitals to serve a Catholic population of 36,905. By his final year as bishop in 1939, there were 56,248 Catholics, 155 priests, 97 parishes, 65 parochial schools, and 13 hospitals. Sacred Heart Junior College in Wichita was established during his tenure in 1933.

John Schwertner died from a stroke at his residence in Wichita on October 2, 1939, at age 68. He is buried at Calvary Cemetery in Wichita.

References

1870 births
1939 deaths
People from Canton, Ohio
Roman Catholic Diocese of Toledo
American people of German descent
Canisius College alumni
St. Mary's Seminary and University alumni
Roman Catholic bishops of Wichita
20th-century Roman Catholic bishops in the United States
Catholics from Ohio